The 1981 Women's World Outdoor Bowls Championship  was held at the Willowdale Bowling Club in Toronto, Canada, from 1 to 15 August 1981. Swaziland replaced Samoa two weeks before the competition started due to the Samoan General Strike

Norma Shaw of England won the singles Gold and double world champion Elsie Wilkie struggled with the difficult greens finishing last of 18. The Pairs went to Ireland, the Triples to Hong Kong and the Fours to England. The Taylor Trophy was won by the English team.

Medallists

Results

Women's singles – round robin

Women's pairs – round robin

+ Injury replacement

Women's triples – round robin

Women's fours – round robin

Taylor Trophy

References

World Outdoor Bowls Championship
World Outdoor Championship
World Outdoor Bowls Championship
World Outdoor Bowls Championship